This is full list of FIS Ski Jumping World Cup team events winners and medalists in ski jumping and ski flying.

Full list

Men's team

Women's team

Mixed

Women's super team

Men's super team

Nations Cup

Men

Women

Stats

Individual team wins 
(includes team & mixed-team events)

Men's team

Men's super team

Ladies' team

Mixed team

Women's super team 

updated: 19 February 2023

References
fis-ski.com

Team
FIS Ski Jumping World Cup